Oxygyne shinzatoi is a flowering plant that is endemic to Okaniwa Island in the Ryukyu Islands, Japan. It blooms in September and October and is critically endangered due to logging.

References

Burmanniaceae